Hüseynqulular or Guseynkullar may refer to:
 Hüseynqulular, Gadabay, Azerbaijan
 Hüseynqulular, Tovuz, Azerbaijan